Jenna Simula (born 13 September 1989 in Oulu) is a Finnish politician currently serving in the Parliament of Finland for the Finns Party at the Oulu constituency.

References

1989 births
Living people
People from Oulu
Finns Party politicians
Members of the Parliament of Finland (2019–23)
21st-century Finnish women politicians
Women members of the Parliament of Finland